Chrást is a municipality and village in Plzeň-City District in the Plzeň Region of the Czech Republic. It has about 1,900 inhabitants.

Transport
The municipality is located on a train line leading from Ejpovice to Radnice. There is a train station which is served by regional trains.

References

Villages in Plzeň-City District